Balkashino (Balkaşin) is a village in northern-central Kazakhstan. It is the seat of Sandyktau District in Aqmola Region.

References

Populated places in Akmola Region